Charles M. Goodman  (November 26, 1906 – October 29, 1992) was an American architect who made a name for his modern designs in suburban Washington, D.C. after World War II. While his work has a regional feel, he ignored the colonial revival look so popular in Virginia. Goodman was quoted in the 1968 survey book Architecture in Virginia as saying that he aimed to "get away from straight historical reproduction."

Goodman, who developed preliminary designs for Washington National Airport and served as main architect of the Hollin Hills neighborhood in Alexandria, Virginia, attended the Illinois Institute of Technology. He came to D.C. in 1934 to work as the designing architect in the Public Buildings Administration. He later served as head architect at the United States Treasury Department and the Air Transport Command. After World War II he worked closely with Robert C. Davenport designing and site planning most of the Hollin Hills, where his firm, Charles M. Goodman Associates, designed over 14 models of house.

During the 1950s and 1960s, Goodman designed prefabricated homes for the National Homes Corporation of Lafayette, Indiana. It is estimated more than 325,000 homes throughout the United States were built using his National Homes’ designs. Such as “The Ranger”, “The Main Line”, “The Custom Line”, and “The Cadet”.

Personal life 
He attended the University of Illinois from 1925 to 1928. At the Armour Institute, he was awarded the Dankmar Adler Prize as an outstanding freshman, and the Hutchinson medal as the leading senior in architecture, and a fellowship at Lake Forest foundation. He graduated in 1934 from Amour Institute’s School of Architecture.

In June 1934, he married Charlotte Kathleen Dodge and they had one daughter together. After her passing and 45 years of marriage in 1979, he then married Dorothy Mae Sopchick on October 30, 1980, in Alexandria, Virginia.

Projects

Residential structures 
Beyond his most known works at Hollin Hills and National Airport, his other notable projects included the 1964 Unitarian Church in Arlington, Virginia at 4444 Arlington Blvd. His residence, Goodman House, was built in 1954 at 514 Quaker Lane in Alexandria. In Reston, he designed a "cluster" of townhouses in the woods above Lake Anne known as Hickory Cluster.

His 1949-51 development at Silver Spring, Maryland was listed on the National Register of Historic Places (NRHP) in 2004 as the Hammond Wood Historic District. His 1951 development at Takoma Park, Maryland was listed on the NRHP in 2004 as the Takoma Avenue Historic District. His 1958-61 development at Silver Spring, Maryland was listed on NRHP, and is known as the Rock Creek Woods Historic District. He also designed 21 twin dwellings in the High Point section of the Virginia Heights Historic District.

In 1957, Alcoa approached Goodman to design and build 50 Alcoa Care-free Homes; one in each state. Due to project difficulties, only 24 were built in 16 states including NRHP-designated properties of Alcoa Care-free Home (Brighton, New York) and one within Hollin Hills Historic District. 

In 1962, Reynolds Aluminum approached the noted architect to develop River Park townhomes along the Southwest Waterfront community of Washington, D.C. and just north of Fort McNair between N and O Streets and Delaware Avenue and 4th Street, SW. Goodman designed the glass and aluminum clad River Park Mutual Homes, which consists of two conjoined high-rise buildings and several clusters of flat and barrel-roof top townhouses.

In the mid-1960s, Goodman created one of his largest projects, the Houston House Apartments, a 31-story apartment complex in downtown Houston, Texas.

Locations receiving National Register of Historic Places (NRHP) designation and time of significance include:
 Nationwide significance:
 Hollin Hills Historic District (1949–1971), Alexandria, Virginia (2013)
 Statewide significance:
 Charles M. Goodman House (1954), Alexandria, Virginia (2013)
 Tauxemont Historic District (1954), Alexandria, Virginia (2006)
 Subdivisions and Architecture Planned and Designed by Charles M. Goodman Associates in Montgomery County, Maryland (Multiple Property Document)
 Moyaone Reserve Historic District, Thomas-Straus (Contributing Building), Accokeek, Maryland (2020)
 Local significance:
 Virginia Heights Historic District (1946–47, 1950), Arlington, Virginia (2008)
 Hammond Wood Historic District (1949), Silver Spring, Maryland (2004)
 Rock Creek Woods Historic District (1958–61), Silver Spring, Maryland (2004)
 Takoma Avenue Historic District (1951–52), Tacoma Park, Maryland (2004) 
 Unitarian Universalist Church of Arlington (1964), Arlington, Virginia (2014)
 Alcoa Care-free Home (1958), Brighton, New York (2010)
 Under review as future NRHP historic district
 Hickory Cluster (90 townhouses) (1965), Reston, Virginia

Post offices and federal buildings 
Upon graduation, Goodman worked as an architect within the Public Buildings Administration (the precursor to today's Public Buildings Service of the U.S. General Services Administration, often with Louis A. Simon and Howard Lovewell Cheney, designing federal buildings, including:

 F. Edward Hébert Federal Building: New Orleans, Louisiana 
 Federal Building at the 1939 New York World's Fair
 U.S. Post Office: Chicago, Illinois: 
 Englewood Station
 Logan Square
 Roseland Station
 Uptown Postal Station
 U.S. Post Office: Covington, Kentucky: Post Office and Court House
 U.S. Post Office: Detroit, Michigan: 
 Highland Park Branch
 New Fairview Station
 U.S. Post Office: Evanston, Illinois
 U.S. Post Office: Flushing, New York: Forest Hills Station
 U.S. Post Office: Granville, Ohio
 U.S. Post Office: Kansas City, Kansas
 U.S. Post Office: Saint Joseph, Michigan

Awards and honors  
Beyond the numerous awards and recognition of his residential neighborhoods reaching National Register of Historic Places status, Goodman has been recognized as one of the most significant architects of the 20th century. 

In 1951, he was awarded Architect of the Year from the Southwest Research Institute (SwRI) for Hollin Hills, one of many awards the community and his home designs would garner over the years. In 1959, he was made a Fellow of the American Institute of Architects (FAIA). One year later, Goodman was awarded the 1960 Gold Medal from the Art Directors Club of Washington.

Goodman was one of eight architects honored as ‘’The People’s Architect’’ by Rice University to commemorate its semi-centennial, 1912–62. Other awardees include: John Lyon Reid, O'Neil Ford, Victor Gruen, I. M. Pei, Vernon DeMars, Pietro Belluschi, and Marshall Shaffer.

In July-August 1982, the AIA Virginia Society's "Outstanding Recognition Award" went to Charles M. Goodman, FAIA. He was cited for the consistent excellence and enduring quality of his design work. Of special note was Goodman's design for Hollin Hills, 450 contemporary single-family homes set in a wooded environment south of Alexandria. Begun in 1946, Hollin Hills received the inaugural award of the Virginia Society, AlA's Test-of Time Award the previous year in 1981. Other Goodman buildings lauded at the presentation were Reston's Hickory Cluster Town Houses, the Unitarian Church of Arlington and numerous buildings in the Westgate Research Park, near Tysons Corner, for which he provided the original land planning.

In 1986, he received the Professional Achievement Award of the IIT Alumni Association.

Gallery

References

Bibliography
 Goodman, Charles M. And Von Eckardt, Wolf; Life for dead spaces: the development of the Lavanburg Commons: An architectural proposal by Charles Goodman, and text by Wolf Von Eckardt. 1st ed. Published for the Fred L. Lavanburg Foundation by Harcourt, Brace & World New York 1963 [1963].

External links

 Houston House Apartments, Houston, 1966
Heart of Glass article from Washington, DC City Paper 2003
Photos of River Park
"Part modern, part farmhouse, Alexandria home is testament to architect Goodman," by Nancy McKeon, The Washington Post, February 18, 2011
 Library of Congress holdings of Goodman drawings
 Rock Creek Woods, a suburban development located in Montgomery County, Maryland just outside Washington, D.C., consists of 76 Contemporary houses nestled in a wooded valley between two creeks.
An Uncommon Architect: Charles M. Goodman and his legacy at The Commons of McLean
 Hickory Cluster (1964)

Modernist architects
People from Alexandria, Virginia
1906 births
1992 deaths
Illinois Institute of Technology alumni
Fellows of the American Institute of Architects
Architects from Virginia
20th-century American architects
Architects from New York City